Monaco 2 (stylised as Monaco II) is an upcoming stealth action video game developed by Pocketwatch Games and published by Humble Games. The game is a sequel to the critically well received Monaco: What's Yours Is Mine (2013). The game is planned to include a form of isometric 3D graphics as opposed to its predecessor's 2D birds-eye view. Further, Monaco 2s introduction of procedural level generation will be new to the series.

Gameplay

Like its predecessor, Monaco 2 is a stealth and action video game where the player partakes in heists and robberies. Players will be able to select from a cast of playable characters to assist them in completing the level. The game is planned to include 3D isometric graphics displayed through a top-down perspective with camera options to allow players to adjust their vision. Additionally, the introduction of procedural generation means the levels are not static.

Development

Monaco 2 is set to be the sequel to the award winning Monaco: What's Yours Is Mine and was announced on March 17, 2022 during the Humble Games Showcase 2022 event by Pocketwatch Games' lead developer Andy Schatz. An animated teaser trailer accompanied the announcement. During the event, Schatz noted that the game would feature 3D graphics to allow players to explore vertically, a concept which was compared to Mission Impossible, as well as procedural level generation. Despite these changes, he ensured that the game would remain faithful to the genres and themes of its predecessor. Another deviation from Monaco is the removal of the greyscale blueprint map design. At the time, Schatz described the game to be the "ultimate heist simulator", with the procedural generation helping to make the environments feel real. Immediate reception to the announcement was positive, especially regarding the early visualisations. Following the announcement, Schatz livestreamed the development of Monaco 2 on Twitch.tv.

The game does not currently have a release date, and it is only confirmed for PC.

References

Further reading
 

Upcoming video games
Action video games
Indie video games
Stealth video games
Video games developed in the United States
Video games scored by Austin Wintory
Video games set in Monaco
Pocketwatch Games
Humble Games games